Steven Bruce Smith (born August 21, 1954) is an American drummer best known as a member of the rock band Journey across three stints: 1978 to 1985, 1995 to 1998 and 2015 to 2020. Modern Drummer magazine readers have voted him the No. 1 All-Around Drummer five years in a row. In 2001, the publication named Smith one of the Top 25 Drummers of All Time, and in 2002 he was voted into the Modern Drummer Hall of Fame. He was inducted into the Rock and Roll Hall of Fame as a member of Journey on April 7, 2017.

Early life
Smith received his first drum kit at age two and in 1963 he began taking formal lessons with local Boston area drum teacher Bill Flanagan, who played in big bands in the swing era. Smith got his first "real" drum set when he was 12 years old. On many nights, Steve could be heard practicing in a small shed in the backyard of his Harvard Street home. Smith performed in the usual school band program and garage bands while in his teens, including Clyde, a South Shore sensation, but also began to broaden his performing experience by playing in a professional concert band and the big band at local Bridgewater State College.

Career

He graduated from high school in 1972, and at 19 he joined the Lin Biviano Big Band, playing with them for two years. After high school, Smith attended the Berklee College of Music and studied with Alan Dawson. In the early 1990s, he studied with Freddie Gruber. He recorded and toured with jazz violinist Jean-Luc Ponty in 1977–78. He was the drummer on the Focus album Focus con Proby (1978) and played with Ronnie Montrose. From 1978 to 1985, he was the drummer for the rock band Journey. He left the band in 1985 but returned in 1995 for the band's comeback album Trial by Fire. In the interim, he played with Journey offshoot The Storm. In 2015, he rejoined Journey again, but was terminated from the group (along with bassist Ross Valory) in March, 2020.

Since 1977, Smith has led his own jazz group, Vital Information. Drummer Neil Peart of Rush invited him in 1994 to perform on Burning for Buddy: A Tribute to the Music of Buddy Rich, a tribute album to Buddy Rich, who inspired both drummers. Smith recorded the song "Nutville" and was invited for the sequel tribute album, Burning for Buddy: A Tribute to the Music of Buddy Rich, Vol. 2, for which he recorded "Moment's Notice". He recorded two albums with Buddy's Buddies, a quintet composed of musicians who played with Rich. In 2007, Smith and Buddy's Buddies were renamed Steve Smith's Jazz Legacy. The band pays tribute to many great jazz drummers in addition to Buddy Rich. In 1989, Smith headlined the Buddy Rich Memorial Scholarship Concert held in New York City, performing a duet with drummer Marvin "Smitty" Smith. Smith released two albums, Very Live at Ronnie Scott's Set One & Set Two, for Tone Center, recorded at Ronnie Scott's club in London.

In 2001 Modern Drummer magazine named Smith one of the Top 25 Drummers of All Time. During the following year, he was voted into the Modern Drummer Hall of Fame. In 2003, his DVD Steve Smith Drumset Technique – History of the U.S. Beat was voted the No. 1 Educational DVD of the year.

He has worked as a session musician for Mariah Carey, Andrea Bocelli, Elisa, Vasco Rossi, Zucchero, Savage Garden, Bryan Adams,  Zakir Hussain and Sandip Burman. Additionally, he has played with jazz musicians such as Steps Ahead, Wadada Leo Smith, Tom Coster, Ahmad Jamal, Dave Liebman, Larry Coryell, Victor Wooten, Mike Stern, Randy Brecker, Scott Henderson, Frank Gambale, Stuart Hamm, Dweezil Zappa, Anthony Jackson, Aydın Esen, Torsten de Winkel, George Brooks, Michael Zilber, Steve Marcus, Andy Fusco, Kai Eckhardt, Lee Musiker, Howard Levy, Oteil Burbridge, Jerry Goodman, Tony MacAlpine, Hiromi Uehara and Bill Evans.

Equipment
Smith endorses Sonor drums, Remo drumheads, Zildjian cymbals, Vic Firth drumsticks and Drum Workshop hardware and bass drum pedals.

Discography

As leader
 1994 Distant Lands (CD Baby/desertnight)
 1999 Steve Smith & Buddy's Buddies (Tone Center)
 2003 Reimagined, Vol. 1: Jazz Standards (Bluejay)
 2003 Very Live at Ronnie Scott's London, Set 1 (Tone Center)
 2003 Very Live at Ronnie Scott's London, Set 2 (Tone Center)
 2005 Sky (Allegro/Tala)
 2005 Flashpoint (Tone Center)
 2005 Lovin' You More (That Big Track) (CR2)
 2008 This Town (G.A.S.)
 2015 Then and Now (Audio & Video Labs)

As member/co-leader
With Journey
 1979 Evolution 
 1980 Departure 
 1980 Dream, After Dream
 1981 Captured 
 1981 Escape
 1981 Live in Houston 1981: The Escape Tour
 1983 Frontiers
 1986 Raised on Radio (partially)
 1996 Trial by Fire
 1998 Greatest Hits Live
 2017 Escape & Frontiers Live in Japan

With Vital Information
 1983 Vital Information
 1984 Orion
 1987 Global Beat
 1988 Fiafiaga
 1991 Vitalive!
 1992 Easier Done Than Said
 1996 Ray of Hope
 1998 Where We Come From
 2000 Live Around the World
 2001 Live from Mars
 2002 Show 'Em Where You Live
 2004 Come on In
 2007 Vitalization
 2012 Live! One Great Night (BFM Jazz)
 2015 Viewpoint (BFM Jazz)
 2017 Heart of the City (BFM Jazz)

With Steps Ahead
 1986 Live in Tokyo 1986
 1989 N.Y.C.
 1992 Yin-Yang
 2016 Steppin' Out

With Vital Tech Tones - with Scott Henderson and Victor Wooten  
 Vital Tech Tones (Tone Center, 1998)
 VTT2 (Tone Center, 2000)

With Steve Smith's Jazz Legacy
 2008 Live on Tour, Vol. 1
 2009 Live on Tour, Vol. 2

With others
 1987 Players with T. Lavitz, Jeff Berlin and Scott Henderson
 1990 Ten, Y&T
 1990 The Storm, The Storm 
 1998 Cause and Effect with Larry Coryell and Tom Coster
 2016 Groove: Blue with Tony Monaco and Vinny Valentino (Q-Rious)

As sideman
With Jeff Berlin
 1985 Champion
 1998 Crossroads

With Frank Gambale
 1987 A Present for the Future
 1991 Note Worker
 1998 Show Me What You Can Do
 2000 The Light Beyond
 2002 GHS3

With Henry Kaiser and Wadada Leo Smith
 2004 Yo Miles: Sky Garden
 2005 Yo Miles: Upriver
 2010 Yo Miles: Lightning
 2010 Yo Miles: Shinjuku

With Neal Schon
 1982 Here to Stay with Jan Hammer
 1989 Late Nite
 1995 Beyond the Thunder
 1997 Electric World
 2012 The Calling
 2015 Vortex

With others
 1977 Focus con Proby, Focus
 1977 Enigmatic Ocean, Jean-Luc Ponty
 1986 Edge of Insanity, Tony MacAlpine
 1989 Richie Kotzen, Richie Kotzen
 1989 Metropolis, Turtle Island String Quartet
 1991 Emotions, Mariah Carey
 1994 Thonk, Michael Manring
 1995 Spirito DiVino, Zucchero
 1999 The Stranger's Hand, with Jerry Goodman, Howard Levy, and Oteil Burbridge
 2000 Room Full of Fools, Kevin Coyne
 2001 Count's Jam Band Reunion, Larry Coryell
 2001 Chromaticity, Tony MacAlpine
 2004 Andrea, Andrea Bocelli

References

Bibliography

External links
 Steve Smith & Vital Information Web Sites
 2012 Audio Interview with Steve Smith from the Podcast "I'd Hit That"

1954 births
Living people
American heavy metal drummers
American jazz drummers
Jazz fusion drummers
Berklee College of Music alumni
Jazz musicians from Massachusetts
Journey (band) members
People from Whitman, Massachusetts
American rock drummers
American session musicians
20th-century American drummers
American male drummers
American male jazz musicians
Whitman-Hanson Regional High School alumni
Focus (band) members
The Storm (American band) members
Vital Information members
Vital Tech Tones members